Shupe may refer to:
Shupe, Virginia, U.S.
Shupe Peak, Victoria Land, Antarctica

People with the surname
Anson Shupe, American sociologist
Bryan Shupe, American politician
Ryan Shupe, American musician
Vince Shupe (1921–1962), Major League Baseball first baseman
Glen Shupe, an Irish drug addict at HBO drama Oz